Runnymede is a hamlet in the Canadian province of Saskatchewan.

Demographics 

References

Cote No. 271, Saskatchewan
Designated places in Saskatchewan
Organized hamlets in Saskatchewan
Division No. 9, Saskatchewan